The 2020 United States Senate election in Virginia was held on November 3, 2020, to elect a member of the United States Senate to represent the Commonwealth of Virginia, concurrently with the 2020 U.S. presidential election, as well as other elections to the United States Senate in other states and elections to the United States House of Representatives and various state and local elections. Incumbent Democratic Senator Mark Warner won reelection to a third term against Republican nominee Daniel Gade.

Of Virginia's 20 most populous counties, Warner won 18, losing only Hanover and Spotsylvania.

Background
Incumbent Senator Mark Warner first won election in 2008 getting 65% of the vote over former governor Jim Gilmore. In 2014, during the Tea Party movement, and declining voter turnout, Senator Warner won re-election with 49.1% of the vote by a margin of 0.8% against former chairman of the Republican National Committee Ed Gillespie.

Democratic primary

Candidates

Nominee
Mark Warner, incumbent U.S. Senator

Republican primary
Seven Republicans declared that they would compete in the race, but only three made the threshold of 3,500 signatures. The original signature threshold was 10,000 signatures, but was lowered to 3,500 following a suit by Omari Faulkner. The primary was on June 23.

Candidates

Nominee
Daniel Gade, college professor and U.S. Army veteran

Eliminated in primary
 Alissa Baldwin, teacher
Thomas Speciale, U.S. Army veteran and intelligence officer

Failed to qualify
 Blaine Dunn, Frederick County supervisor
 Omari Faulkner, Navy reservist and former Georgetown University basketball player
 Roger Franklin
 Victor Williams, attorney and activist

Withdrawn
 Gary Adkins, financial executive
 John Easley, Republican candidate for Virginia's 1st congressional district in 2020
 Scott Taylor, former U.S. Representative for Virginia's 2nd congressional district (running for his former House seat)

Declined
Nick Freitas, state delegate and candidate for U.S. Senate in 2018 (running for U.S. House)
 Corey Stewart, nominee for U.S. Senate in 2018 and former chairman of the Prince William Board of County Supervisors

Endorsements

Results

Independents

Withdrawn
Mary Knapp
Aldous Mina, Peace Corps veteran

General election
Due to Virginia's shift to the left throughout the 2010s, Virginia's 2020 Senate Election was widely considered to be a safe hold for Mark Warner. Warner's razor-thin victory over Ed Gillespie 6 years earlier was widely considered to be a fluke owing to lowered turnout and complacency. On election day, Warner was declared the winner as soon as polls closed based on exit polling alone. The higher turnout is attributable to being held concurrently with the Presidential Election. Warner also notably outperformed Biden in the state, albeit narrowly.

Debates
Complete video of debate, September 23, 2020

Predictions

Endorsements

Polling
Graphical summary

with Mark Warner and Generic Republican

with Generic Democrat and Generic Republican

Results 

Counties that flipped from Republican to Democratic
 Chesapeake (independent city)
 Chesterfield (largest municipality: Chester)
 Essex (largest municipality: Tappahannock)
 James City (no municipalities)
 Loudoun (largest municipality: Leesburg)
 Lynchburg (independent city)
 Stafford (largest municipality: Aquia Harbour)
 Staunton (independent city)
 Virginia Beach (independent city)
 Winchester (independent city)

Counties that flipped from Democratic to Republican
 Alleghany (largest municipality: Clifton Forge)
 Covington (independent city)

Notes

References

External links
 
 
  (State affiliate of the U.S. League of Women Voters)
 

Official campaign websites
 Daniel Gade (R) for Senate
 Mark Warner (D) for Senate

2020
Virginia
United States Senate
Mark Warner